Na Golici is a Slovenian polka instrumental composed by Slavko Avsenik and arranged by his brother Vilko Avsenik. The song was written in 1954 and first recorded in January 1955 in the studio of Radio Kärnten. It is considered the most played instrumental tune in the world. At this time, the band was renamed to Gorenjski kvintet (Original Oberkrainer Quintett). This song has been covered more than 600 times all over the world.

It is known mainly for its fields of wild white narcissi, swathes of which cover Golica and surrounding pastures in late April and early May. Despite having given the song this title, Slavko Avsenik was never in his life on Golica. Today the band is known as Ansambel bratov Avsenik (Slavko Avsenik Und Seine Original Oberkrainer), even though the band no longers exists.

References

External links

1955 singles
Slovenian songs
Number-one singles in Switzerland
Number-one singles in Germany
Number-one singles in Austria